Tommy Callaghan (born 6 December 1945) is a Scottish former footballer who played for Celtic, Dunfermline Athletic and Clydebank. He was a left-sided midfielder famous for his long attacking runs from deep positions, and powerful shot.

Born in Cowdenbeath, he signed for Celtic from Dunfermline on 22 November 1968 for a reported £35,000. Although he scored on his debut the following day in a 4–0 win over Partick Thistle at Firhill, he took a long time to settle at Celtic Park and was never really accepted by the supporters. After making more than 250 appearances for Celtic, Callaghan moved on to Clydebank on 4 November 1976. He scored for his new club on his debut three days later. He left Clydebank in 1978 to become player-manager of Galway Rovers in Ireland.

Callaghan represented the Scottish League twice and gained his first Scottish Cup winner's medal while with Dunfermline in 1968, his final season with the Fife club.

His brother Willie played for Dunfermline and Scotland, and his father William, maternal uncles Patrick Flannigan and David Flannigan, son Tommy Callaghan Jr nephew Willie Callaghan Jr, and grand-nephew Liam Callaghan all played football to some extent.

References

Sources
 
 

1945 births
Celtic F.C. players
Clydebank F.C. (1965) players
Dunfermline Athletic F.C. players
Expatriate association footballers in the Republic of Ireland
Association football midfielders
League of Ireland managers
Galway United F.C. managers
League of Ireland players
Galway United F.C. players
Living people
People from Cowdenbeath
Scottish expatriate footballers
Scottish Football League players
Scottish football managers
Scottish footballers
Scottish Football League representative players
San Antonio Thunder players
Expatriate soccer players in the United States
North American Soccer League (1968–1984) players
Lochore Welfare F.C. players
Scottish expatriate sportspeople in Ireland
Scottish expatriate football managers
Scottish expatriate sportspeople in the United States
Footballers from Fife
Scottish Junior Football Association players